Ottavio Mastrojanni (19 February 1896 - 31 January 1957) was an Italian politician.

Mastrojanni was born in Nicosia, Sicily. He represented the Common Man's Front in the Constituent Assembly of Italy from 1946 to 1948.

References

1896 births
1957 deaths
Politicians from the Province of Enna
Common Man's Front politicians
Members of the Constituent Assembly of Italy
People from Nicosia, Sicily